The Lone Star Athletics (previously the Austin Athletics) are an American professional Twenty20 franchise cricket team that compete in Minor League Cricket (MiLC). The team is based in Austin, Texas. It was formed in 2020 as part of 24 original teams to compete in Minor League Cricket. The franchise is owned by Manish Patel and Partners.

The team's home ground is Moosa Stadium, located in Pearland, Texas. Former Canadian cricket team captain Nitish Kumar helms captaincy duties, while William Perkins stands by as vice-captain.

Captain Nitish Kumar and American cricketer Laksh Parikh lead the bowling and batting leaderboards with 407 runs and 20 wickets respectively.

Franchise history

Background 
Talks of an American Twenty20 league started in November 2018 just before USA Cricket became the new governing body of cricket in the United States. In May 2021, USA Cricket announced they had accepted a bid by American Cricket Enterprises (ACE) for a US$1 billion investment covering the league and other investments benefitting the U.S. national teams.

In an Annual General Meeting on February 21, 2020, it was announced that USA Cricket was planning to launch Major League Cricket in 2021 and Minor League Cricket that summer, but it was delayed due to the COVID-19 pandemic and due to the lack of high-quality cricket stadiums in the USA. Major League Cricket was pushed to a summer-2023 launch and Minor League Cricket was pushed back to July 31, 2021.

USA Cricket CEO Iain Higgins also pointed out cities such as New York City, Houston and Los Angeles with a large cricket fanbase, and targeted them among others as launch cities for Minor League Cricket.

Exhibition league 
In July 2020, the player registration for the Minor League Cricket exhibition league began. On August 15, 2020, USA Cricket announced the teams participating in the exhibition league matches, also listing the owners for each team. The draft for the exhibition league began on August 22, 2020, with the Lone Star Athletics releasing their squad on August 24. Willem Ludick was later named as captain for the Lone Star Athletics for the exhibition league.

2021 season 

After the conclusion of the exhibition league, USA Cricket announced that they were planning to launch the inaugural season of Minor League Cricket in spring 2021. Ahead of the official season, which was announced to kick off on July 31, the Athletics announced Nitish Kumar as captain with William Perkins helming vice-captain duties.

Throughout the group stage, the Athletics won twice against the Catchers, the Mustangs, the Stars, and the Americans, but they won once against the Master Blasters, the Lashings, the Surf Riders, and the Hurricanes. However, the Athletics lost twice against the Chicago Blasters and the Hurricanes. The Athletics' good performance in the group stage allowed for them to proceed to the quarter-finals.

In the quarter-finals, the Athletics were matched up with eventual title winners, Silicon Valley Strikers. However, the Athletics lost to the Strikers in a best-of-three game series 2-1.

2022 season 
Ahead of the 2022 season, Major League Cricket announced that it was renaming the Austin Athletics to the Lone Star Athletics. MLC also announced that the draft for that season would take place on May 12.

Current squad 
 Players with international caps are listed in bold.
  denotes a player who is currently unavailable for selection.
  denotes a player who is unavailable for rest of the season

Statistics

Most runs 

Source: CricClubs, Last updated: 10 May 2022

Most wickets 

Source: CricClubs, Last updated: 10 May 2022

See also 
 Major League Cricket
 Minor League Cricket
 2021 Minor League Cricket season
 2021 Minor League Cricket season final
 Minor League Cricket teams

References 

Minor League Cricket teams
Cricket clubs established in 2020
2020 establishments in Texas
Sports teams in Austin, Texas